The Mali men's national under-18 and under-19 basketball team is the representative for Mali in international basketball competitions, and it is organized and run by the Fédération Malienne de Basketball . The Mali men's national under-18 basketball team represents Mali at the FIBA Africa Under-18 Championship, where they have a chance to qualify into the FIBA Under-19 World Cup.

At the 2019 FIBA Under-19 Basketball World Cup, Mali broke every record of African basketball teams as the team finished runner-up only to the favorites United States.

Current squad
Team at the 2019 FIBA Under-19 Basketball World Cup: (Silver medal squad)

Competitive record

FIBA Under-19 World Cup

FIBA Africa Under-18 Championship

See also
Mali national basketball team

References

External links
 Fédération Malienne de Basketball

B
Basketball teams in Mali
Men's national under-18 basketball teams
Men's national under-19 basketball teams